Leventochori is a village in the municipality of Pyrgos, Elis, Greece.  In 2011, it had a population of 204. It is located near the Ionian Sea, at the foot of a low hill. It is 1 km south of Skafidia, 3 km west of Skourochori, 4 km northeast of Katakolo and 10 km west of Pyrgos town centre.

Population

See also
List of settlements in Elis

External links
Leventochori at the GTP Travel Pages

References

Pyrgos, Elis
Populated places in Elis